The following airports are in the area around the San Francisco Bay, including the cities of San Jose, San Francisco, and Oakland.  The list includes only public-use and/or government-owned airports in the eleven counties (the nine counties that border the bay, plus Santa Cruz and San Benito Counties) that make up the Census Bureau's San Jose–San Francisco–Oakland, CA Combined Statistical Area.

Commercial airports 

The Bay Area has four airports with airline service.
 San Francisco International Airport (KSFO) — Class B airspace
 Norman Y. Mineta San José International Airport (KSJC) — Class C airspace
 Oakland International Airport (KOAK) — Class C airspace
 Charles M. Schulz–Sonoma County Airport (KSTS) — Class D airspace

Federal airports

The following airports are operated by the federal government and are not open to the public.  These airports have Class D airspace.
 Moffett Federal Airfield (KNUQ) in Mountain View and Sunnyvale, Santa Clara County
 Travis Air Force Base (KSUU) in Fairfield, Solano County

General aviation airports

Towered 

The following general aviation airports have enough traffic to have an air traffic control tower.  These airports have Class D airspace.
 Buchanan Field Airport (KCCR) in Concord, Contra Costa County
 Hayward Executive Airport (KHWD) in Hayward, Alameda County
 Livermore Municipal Airport (KLVK) in Livermore, Alameda County
 Napa County Airport (KAPC) in Napa, Napa County
 Palo Alto Airport (KPAO) in Palo Alto, Santa Clara County
 Reid–Hillview Airport (KRHV) in San Jose, Santa Clara County
 San Carlos Airport (KSQL) in San Carlos, San Mateo County

Non-towered 

The following airports do not have control towers, but are listed by their owners as open to the public. Pilots announce runway and airspace usage via radio contact. These airports have Class E airspace for those with an FAA-published instrument approach procedure, or Class G airspace otherwise.
 Angwin–Parrett Field (2O3) in Angwin, Napa County
 Byron Airport (C83) in Byron, Contra Costa County
 Cloverdale Municipal Airport (O60) in Cloverdale, Sonoma County
 Gnoss Field (KDVO) in Novato, Marin County
 Half Moon Bay Airport (KHAF) in Half Moon Bay, San Mateo County
 Healdsburg Municipal Airport (KHES) in Healdsburg, Sonoma County
 Hollister Municipal Airport (KCVH) in Hollister, San Benito County
 Nut Tree Airport (KVCB) in Vacaville, Solano County
 Petaluma Municipal Airport (O69) in Petaluma, Sonoma County
 Rio Vista Municipal Airport (O88) in Rio Vista, Solano County
 Sonoma Skypark (0Q9) in Sonoma, Sonoma County
 Sonoma Valley Airport (0Q3) in Sonoma, Sonoma County
 San Martin Airport (E16) in San Martin, Santa Clara County
 Watsonville Municipal Airport (KWVI) in Watsonville, Santa Cruz County

Notable historical airports
 Naval Air Station Alameda in Alameda, Alameda County (closed 1997)
 Alum Rock Airport in San Jose, Santa Clara County (closed approximately 1936)
 Crissy Field in the City and County of San Francisco (airfield closed 1974)
 Hamilton Air Force Base in Novato, Marin County (closed 1996)
 Santa Cruz Skypark in Scotts Valley, Santa Cruz County (closed 1983)
 Carmel Valley Airport in Carmel Valley, California (closed 2002)

Former airports
 Antioch Airport in Antioch, California
 Fremont Airport (identifier Q59) in Fremont, California
 Montgomery Field / Marina Airfield, now called Marina Green (Airmail Facility), San Francisco, California, formerly named after aviation pioneer John Joseph Montgomery
 Sky Sailing Gliderport in Fremont California
 Vacaville Airport/Vacaville Gliderport, in Vacaville, California

See also

 List of airports in California
 List of airports of Santa Cruz County, California

San Francisco Bay Area
Airports